The South Pacific Championship (also known as SPC) was a rugby union competition that was introduced in 1986 and contested through to 1990. The competition featured six teams - three provinces from New Zealand; Auckland, Canterbury and Wellington, two Australian teams; Queensland and New South Wales, and one team representing Pacific Island rugby, Fiji.

The South Pacific Championship was the predecessor of the Super 6 and Super 10, as well as the professional-era Super 12 and Super 14 tournaments that subsequently expanded to become the Super Rugby competition.

Background
The AGC South Pacific Championship was organised by the New South Wales Rugby Union (NSWRU) on an invitational basis. The impetus for starting the competition was to provide regular matches for the New South Wales and Queensland teams in an attempt to compete against rugby league football - which was expanding its domestic competition in Australia.

The New Zealand provincial teams Auckland and Canterbury were invited into the competition due to their close links with the New South Wales and Queensland unions respectively. A third New Zealand team, Wellington, was invited due to having an international airport in the city. Fiji was also invited into the competition as, at the time, it was the most competitive of the Pacific rugby teams.

History
The South Pacific Championship was dominated by New Zealand teams and, most particularly, by Auckland. Canterbury won the first title in 1986 and shared the second title with Auckland in 1987, but then Auckland won outright for the next three seasons in a row.

The competition collapsed five years after it began, when the NSWRU found itself in financial difficulties before the 1991 season was started.

SPC
Championship Winner:
 1986 Canterbury
 1987 Auckland and Canterbury
 1988 Auckland
 1989 Auckland
 1990 Auckland
 1991 No competition

Relaunch
After the demise of the South Pacific Championship, with no tournament played in 1991, the competition was relaunched as the Super 6 in 1992. This followed a resurgence of rugby fortunes after the 1991 Rugby World Cup. The Super 6 title was won by Queensland (Australia) in 1992.

In 1993, the competition was revamped and expanded into the Super 10. South Africa's top three provincial teams were included and a fourth New Zealand province was added. Western Samoa, being the winner of the Pacific Tri-Nations, replaced Fiji. The Super 10 was won by Transvaal (South Africa) in 1993, and by Queensland (Australia) in 1994 and 1995.

Super 6
Championship Winner:
 1992 Queensland

Super 10

Championship Winner:
 1993 Transvaal
 1994 Queensland
 1995 Queensland

1986 season
Standings

1987 season
Standings

1988 season
Standings

1989 season
Standings

1990 season
Standings

1992 Super 6
The South Pacific Championship was relaunched as the Super 6 in 1992.  won the title, in an undefeated Super 6 season for the Australian province.

The competition was the predecessor of the Super 10 that launched the following year in 1993 to include South African provinces. The Super 10 was, in turn, the predecessor of the Super 12, Super 14 and Super Rugby tournaments in the professional era of rugby union which started in 1996.

Standings

Matches

See also

 Super 10 Rugby
 Super Rugby

References

Bibliography
 

Super Rugby
Rugby union competitions in Australia
Rugby union competitions in Fiji
Rugby union competitions in New Zealand
Rugby union competitions for provincial teams